Ramat Gilad is an Israeli outpost in the West Bank under the jurisdiction of Shomron Regional Council. Israeli outposts in the West Bank are considered illegal both under international law as well as under Israeli law.

Located to the north of Karnei Shomron, the outpost was established in 2001 and named after Gilad Zar, a security coordinator of the Shomron Regional Council, who was shot and killed in 2001. Ramat Gilad, home to 13 families in 2009, was considered an unauthorized outpost by the Israeli government until 2011, when a deal was reached between the government and the residents to remove nine homes located on privately owned Palestinian land. In May 2014, the Israeli government decided to demolish six of its buildings and a synagogue, all built on Palestinian land.

See also
Havat Gilad

References

External links

 

Israeli settlements in the West Bank
Populated places established in 2001
Israeli outposts
Unauthorized Israeli settlements